Ralph Lawrence Grayson (1921–1991) was a scientist, engineer, pilot, attorney, soldier, father and husband. He went on to be a pioneer in network computing at both the Federal Aviation Administration (FAA) and NASA.

Early life 
On April 29, 1921, Grayson was born in Fort Smith, Arkansas. Grayson's father was Albert Grayson, an Arkansas sharecropper. Grayson's mother was Pearl Foster Grayson (1895–1934). Grayson was the eldest and he had seven other siblings. Grayson also had 3 step-siblings.

Career 
In 1979 Ralph retired from the FAA as Associate Commander, Memphis Air Route Traffic Control Center. During this time, NASA made many overtures to recruit him. He initially turned these offers down. He was then approached with a package deal through Battelle, employed as a subcontractor. He accepted.

His title at NASA was principal research scientist, Aviation Safety Reporting, System Project Office located at Moffett Field Naval Air Station in Mountain View, California.

Ralph Grayson was an international calibre expert in the field of aviation safety — human error, redundancy systems, and computerized safety systems. His technical papers written during his final years at the FAA and his time at NASA would become reference material within the field for a generation. Many of both the procedural and technological innovations he brought to the Air Traffic Control system outlived him, and remained in use into the 21st century.

References

External links
 NASA Technical Paper #1875, by Ralph L. Grayson and Charles E. Billings, pdf file
 The Human Factor in Commercial Aviation, Princeton University Press, pdf file
 4-286 Interactive Family Histories
 The Electric Car, GigantiCo

1921 births
1991 deaths
20th-century American engineers
People from Fort Smith, Arkansas